Jayanta Madhab Bora (জয়ন্ত মাধৱ বৰা) is an Assamese novelist who was awarded with the Sahitya Akademi Award in 2017 for Moriahola.

The novel is set against the backdrop of the hamlet Moriahola that got submerged in the Brahmaputra.The author did research on materials collected on the socio-economic crisis of the village and the villagers for 25 years from 1985.

Awards and recognition
 2017: Received Sahitya Akademi Award in 2017 for Moriahola

References

Living people
Assamese-language writers
People from Dergaon
1970 births
Novelists from Assam
Dibrugarh University alumni
Recipients of the Sahitya Akademi Award in Assamese